Valkannadi is a 2002 Indian Malayalam language film starring Kalabhavan Mani, and Geethu Mohandas. Appunni is a blacksmith who has a history of mental health problems in his family, hence he is sent to an ayurvedic asylum. After he returns his mother and Devu become his strengths and his support.

Cast
Kalabhavan Mani  as  Appunni
Geethu Mohandas  as  Devu
K.P.A.C. Lalitha  as Kuttiyamma
Thilakan as Raghavan
Anil Murali as Thamban
Babu Namboothiri   as Kunjuraman
Salim Kumar as Raghavan
Mala Aravindan as  Unnithiri Vaidyar
Indrans as Kanaran

Soundtrack

References

External links
 

2002 films
2000s Malayalam-language films
Films scored by M. Jayachandran